Johnstown is an unincorporated community in Grand Forks County, North Dakota, United States.  It is the nearest community to the Midway Bridge, which is listed on the National Register of Historic Places.

References

Populated places in Grand Forks County, North Dakota
Unincorporated communities in Grand Forks County, North Dakota
Unincorporated communities in North Dakota